The Kyll Viaduct has a span of  and is the largest arch bridge in Germany that is made entirely of reinforced concrete and prestressed concrete.

The bridge carries the A 60 motorway over the valley of the Kyll in the Eifel mountains near Wilsecker between the junctions of Bitburg and Badem, and was built from 1995 to 1999. It has a total length of 645 metres and a maximum height of 93 metres.

See also 
 List of bridges in Germany

External links 
 

Arch bridges
Road bridges in Germany
Eifel
1990s architecture